Walter William Paul Buck (4 March 1900 – 20 October 1980) was an Australian rules footballer who played with Collingwood in the Victorian Football League (VFL).

In October 1918, aged 18 and a half, Buck enlisted to serve in World War I but the war ended before he was mobilised and he never actively served.

Notes

External links 

Bill Buck's profile at Collingwood Forever

1900 births
1980 deaths
Australian rules footballers from Melbourne
Collingwood Football Club players
People from Hawthorn, Victoria